Bellevue Beach is a local service district and designated place in the Canadian province of Newfoundland and Labrador.

Geography 
Bellevue Beach is in Newfoundland within Subdivision A of Division No. 1.

Demographics 

Government 
Bellevue Beach is a local service district (LSD) that is governed by a committee responsible for the provision of certain services to the community. The chair of the LSD committee is Shelia J. Fahey.

See also 
List of communities in Newfoundland and Labrador
List of designated places in Newfoundland and Labrador
List of local service districts in Newfoundland and Labrador

References 

Designated places in Newfoundland and Labrador
Local service districts in Newfoundland and Labrador